The 1973 NCAA Division II football season, part of college football in the United States organized by the National Collegiate Athletic Association at the Division II level. The season began in September and concluded with the Division II Championship on December 15 at Hughes Stadium in Sacramento, California. This was the first season for Division II (and Division III) football, which were formerly in the College Division in 1972 and prior.

Louisiana Tech won their first Division II championship, defeating Western Kentucky 34–0 in the Camellia Bowl championship game.

Conference realignment

Membership changes

Conference standings

Conference summaries

Postseason

The 1973 NCAA Division II Football Championship playoffs were the first single-elimination tournament to determine the national champion of men's NCAA Division II college football. The inaugural edition had only eight teams; of the four quarterfinal games, three were played on campus and a fourth was in Atlantic City, New Jersey, the final edition of the Boardwalk Bowl. The semifinals were held at the Grantland Rice Bowl in Baton Rouge, Louisiana, and the Pioneer Bowl in Wichita Falls, Texas.

The championship game was the Camellia Bowl, held at Hughes Stadium in Sacramento, California. The Louisiana Tech Bulldogs defeated the Western Kentucky Hilltoppers 34–0 to win their first national title.

Playoff bracket

* Denotes host institution

Rankings

United Press International (UPI) and the Associated Press (AP) continued to rank teams in their College Division or "small college" polls, which had started in 1958 and 1960, respectively.  In 1973, UPI published their final poll at the end of the regular season, while the AP waited until postseason games had been completed.  Both wire services named the Tennessee State Tigers as the number one team; Tennessee State did not compete in the playoffs "because five of its starters would not be eligible to play." The players in question had sat out their freshmen year ("redshirt") and then played four seasons; under NCAA rules at the time, such players were not eligible for postseason play as fifth-year seniors. During the regular season, the Tigers were undefeated (10–0) and had outscored their opponents 333–87.

United Press International (coaches) final poll
Published on November 28

Associated Press (writers) final poll
Published on December 19

Record includes NAIA Division I playoff games
Record includes NCAA Division II playoff games
Record includes NCAA Division III playoff games

See also
1973 NCAA Division I football season
1973 NCAA Division III football season
1973 NAIA Division I football season
1973 NAIA Division II football season

References